Roman and Williams Building and Interiors is an American-owned, New York-based design studio known for its work on hotels, restaurants, retail spaces, homes and product design. Founded in 2002 by Robin Standefer and Stephen Alesch, the firm encompasses Roman and Williams Guild New York (RW Guild) - a brick-and-mortar store of premium, artful home furnishings, accessories and housewares which include Roman and Williams' own product design collection as well as specially crafted pieces produced by artisans from around the world. The RW Guild stand-alone is also home to Roman and Williams' French restaurant, La Mercerie, helmed by Chef Marie-Aude Rose and Emily Thompson Flowers.

Known for what the Wall Street Journal has named  "slow design," with its emphasis on craft and substance, the firm undertakes building design, interior design, branding, as well as the design of custom furniture, lighting, and plumbing fittings and fixtures.

In 2011 the firm's principals, Standefer and Alesch, were recognized in Fast Company's list of "America's 50 Most Influential Designers." They went on to win The Wall Street Journal's 2017 Innovators Award in the Design category, and in 2018 the pair received the "Visionaries Award" by the Sir John Soane's Museum Foundation as well as an award for "Architecture" by Fashion Group International.

The firm won the 2010 Palladio Award for Multi-Unit Residential Project, it has topped Architectural Digest's biennial "AD 100" list three consecutive times since 2012, and in 2014 it received the Cooper Hewitt National Design Award for Interior Design.

In 2016, Roman and Williams was commissioned to redesign the British Galleries at The Metropolitan Museum of Art, set to open in fall of 2019. This commission was the firm's first project in a museum.

Principals

Robin Standefer was born in New York City and studied at the Art Students League and the Academia di Belle Arti di Firenze. During this time, she also apprenticed with Robert Mapplethorpe and James Rosenquist Standefer attended City University of New York to study art history under the direction of Linda Nochlin. She also attended Smith College before graduating from Hampshire College. In 1993, she was hired by film director Martin Scorsese to work as a visual consultant for several of his films which led to a 15-year career in film design.

Stephen Alesch is a designer, draftsman, photographer, painter, illustrator, etcher, and printer who studied engineering and philosophy at Northern Arizona University. He left the university for an architectural apprenticeship and worked for architecture firms Bahram Nashat, Quentin Dart Parker, and Venice Atelier in Los Angeles.

Standefer and Alesch met in the 1990s while working in Hollywood as production designers and art directors. Together, they designed more than 20 Hollywood films, including Practical Magic, Addicted to Love and Zoolander.

The couple are married and live in New York City; they also spend time at their residence in Montauk, New York.

Firm history
Standefer and Alesch's first residential design project was for Ben Stiller, who hired the pair to design his family's Los Angeles home after working with them on the set of his film Duplex, leading to the founding of their firm, Roman and Williams Buildings and Interiors.

The firm's first office was located on the lot of Paramount Pictures, before moving back to New York in 2004 and establishing its office on Lafayette Street.

After the launch of their firm, Roman and Williams designed major residential projects for A-list celebrity clients including Kate Hudson, Elisabeth Shue and Davis Guggenheim, and Gwyneth Paltrow. Other residential projects include the renovation and expansion of one of Frank Lloyd Wright's Usonian Houses.

Standefer and Alesch view their own homes, in Manhattan and Montauk, as perhaps the purest expression of their interests, and the homes act as design laboratories and inspirations for the firm's projects. The New York Times called their East Fourth Street loft, "an appealing hybrid, as if an apartment from the Apthorp had been reassembled by the furniture designers Pierre Chareau or Jean Prouve."

The firm completed its first ground-up residential building at 211 Elizabeth Street, in NoLiTa, renowned for its use of traditional, hand-laid brick.

Among the firm's completed commercial projects are: the renovation of the Royalton Hotel, the interiors of the Standard Hotel (including The Standard Grill and the 18th Floor Club, also known as the Boom Boom Room), for hotelier Andre Balazs, and the Ace Hotel, for hotelier Alex Calderwood – including The Breslin and John Dory restaurants, created by celebrated chef April Bloomfield and restaurateur Ken Friedman, and Stumptown Coffee Shop.

Additional Manhattan projects have included Roman and Williams' 2015 design of Stephen Starr's Upland Restaurant and Andrew Carmellini's SoHo restaurant, The Dutch, followed up by Lafayette, which launched in 2013 and has been called "The Great Gatsby of restaurants" by the New York Observer.

From 2013 to 2015, Roman and Williams finished several hotel projects in the United States including in Manhattan, Brooklyn, Connecticut and Chicago as well as the Freehand Miami in Miami Beach. The firm is the interior designer for the Freehand brand, which now includes hotels in Miami Beach, Florida and Chicago, IL with plans for future Freehand hotel openings in Los Angeles and New York.  During this period the firm also completed the interiors for the Award-winning Chicago Athletic Association, located on Millennial Park, which has been named the best new hotel in America by Men's Journal. Additional hotel projects include Viceroy Hotel New York, which opened in Midtown New York in October 2013 and features a Roman and Williams-designed exterior and interior, as well as custom designed lighting and furniture by the firm in the guest rooms.

The firm's other completed projects include the design of the goop mrkt pop-up store, working with goop Creative Director Gwyneth Paltrow and featuring the designs of Valentino.   Other projects include a mess hall on the new Facebook campus in Menlo Park, California, and the HuffPost Live studio set and offices in New York, which debuted Spring 2012.

In 2014, Roman and Williams expanded beyond the United States with Cantinery, a restaurant located in the heart of Istanbul's Zorlu Center, followed by the opening of Replay - The Stage, the brand's flagship store in Milan which also includes a full-service restaurant, also designed by Roman and Williams.

The firm has designed two ground-up residential buildings. The first, at 211 Elizabeth Street, in NoLiTa, was praised for its use of traditional, hand-laid brick. The second, The Fitzroy, was designed for JDS Development and is located in Chelsea, near the High Line.

In May 2016 The Metropolitan Museum of Art announced that Roman and Williams Buildings and Interiors is collaborating with The Met's Department of European Sculpture and Decorative Arts and other staff  on an ambitious renovation project to create a "spectacular, narrative-rich, and profoundly sympathetic setting for the works of art". Ten galleries devoted to British decorative arts and sculpture of the early 16th through 19th century will be reimagined and reinstalled, including three historic interiors.

Product design

Roman and Williams launched a product design division in September 2012, and since then have designed several product and furniture lines, including their R.W. Atlas line for Waterworks, released in September 2012. Their furniture designs for MatterMade premiered at ICFF in May 2013 and the line was praised by the New York Times for having a "laserlike attention to details."

Such work includes a custom-made credenza, The Eater, which debuted in Milan, Italy during Salone del Mobile as part of Wallpaper Magazine's Handmade Project.

In celebration of their tenth year, the firm released a monograph, Things We Made, with  Rizzoli, in October 2012, followed by the release of a Japanese edition in May 2014 with Graphic-Sha. The book shows the firm's work from the past decade, as well as the principals' previous work in film.

Works

Major residential projects by the duo include a refurbishment of the Usonian House. Commercial works include the design of the Facebook cafeteria. The firm has also designed the interiors of several hotels for the Sydell Group, including the Freehand Hotel in Miami  and the Ace Hotel in Brooklyn, New York City.

Product

Waterworks – "RW Atlas" line of fixtures, bath furniture, and tiles (launched Fall 2012)
Rizzoli International – Things We Made monograph (published Fall 2012)
Matter – "Roman and Williams+MatterMade" line of furniture and lighting (launched Spring 2013)
Waterworks – "R.W. Atlas" line of fixtures, lighting, and hardware (launched September 2014)

Awards 

 2018 – ELLE DÉCOR "The A-List", Roman and Williams Buildings and Interiors
 2018 – Soane Foundation Honors Award "Visionaries", Principals Robin Standefer and Stephen Alesch of Roman and Williams Buildings and Interiors
 2018 – Fashion Group International "Architecture Award", Principals Robin Standefer and Stephen Alesch of Roman and Williams
 2017 – WSJ Magazine "Design Innovators", Principals Robin Standefer and Stephen Alesch of Roman and Williams
 2017 – Awards for Hospitality, Experience and Design, "Restaurant" category winner, Le Coucou
 2017 – James Beard Award "2017 Best New Restaurant", Le Coucou
 2017 – Hospitality Design Awards "Lifestyle Public Space", Ace Hotel New Orleans
 2016 – Fast Company "100 Most Creative People in Business", Principals Robin Standefer and Stephen Alesch of Roman and Williams
 2016 – Architectural Digest  "AD100 – Hitmakers", Principals Robin Standefer and Stephen Alesch of Roman and Williams
 2016 – Conde Nast Traveler  "Top 10 Hotels in the United States, Hotel Emma
 2015 – Driehaus Foundation Preservation Award Winner, Chicago Athletic Association
 2015 – EuroShop Retail Design Award for "Best Store Design", Replay the Stage
 2015 – Gold Key Award for Excellence in Hospitality Design "Best Upscale Hotel", Chicago Athletic Association
 2014- Architectural Digest "AD100", Principals Robin Standefer and Stephen Alesch of Roman and Williams
 2014 – Wallpaper Magazine "Top 100 Designers", Principals Robin Standefer and Stephen Alesch of Roman and Williams
 2014 – Cooper Hewitt National Design Award for "Interior Design", Roman and Williams Buildings and Interiors
 2013 – ELLE Décor "A List Designers", Principals Robin Standefer and Stephen Alesch of Roman and Williams
 2013 – Lawrence Israel Prize, Roman and Williams Buildings and Interiors
 2013 – Eater Award "Stone Cold Stunner", Lafayette
 2012 – Architectural Digest "AD100", Principals Robin Standefer and Stephen Alesch of Roman and Williams
 2011 – Fast Company FastCo Design's 50 Most Influential Designers, Principals Robin Standefer and Stephen Alesch of Roman and Williams
 2011 – Eater Award "Restaurant of the Year", The Dutch
 2010 – Palladio Award for Multi-Unit Residential Project, 211 Elizabeth Street
 2009 – Interior Design "Best of Year – Boutique Hotel", Ace Hotel New York
 2009 – The New York Times "The Nifty 50" Principals Robin Standefer and Stephen Alesch of Roman and Williams
 2008 – Hospitality Design Magazine "Luxury Hotel Design" Finalist, Freehand New York

Work for film

Robin Standefer film credits

Stephen Alesch film credits

References
Notes

Bibliography

External links

Design companies of the United States
American designers
21st-century American architects
New Classical architects